Polly Pocket is a toy line of dolls and accessories first founded and designed by Chris Wiggs in 1983 and licensed by Bluebird Toys from 1989 until both entities/properties were acquired by Mattel in 1998.

History
Polly Pocket was first designed by Chris Wiggs in 1983 for his daughter Kate. Using a makeup powder compact, he fashioned a small house for the tiny doll. Bluebird Toys of Swindon, England, licensed the concept and the first Polly Pocket toys appeared in stores in 1989. Mattel held a distribution arrangement with Bluebird Toys for Polly Pocket items in the early 1990s. In 1998, while production lulled/slowed down, Bluebird Toys endured multiple hostile takeover attempts until Mattel finally purchased both the brand and Bluebird Toys later that year. The sets made by Bluebird Toys are now valuable collectables.

The original Polly Pocket toys were plastic cases that opened to form a dollhouse or other playset with Polly Pocket figurines less than an inch tall. The dolls folded in the middle, like the case, and had circular bases which slotted into holes in the case interior, allowing them to stand securely at particular points in the house. This was particularly useful for moving points in the case. Because the dolls were so small, sometimes they came enclosed in pendants or large rings instead of the more typical playset cases.

In 1998, Mattel redesigned Polly Pocket. The new doll was larger, with a more lifelike appearance than the original dolls. She had a straight ponytail, rather than the curly bob hairstyle used previously. The following year, Mattel also introduced "Fashion Polly!," which used the same characters from the new Polly Pocket (Polly, Lea, Shani, Lila, etc.), but they came in the form of  plastic jointed dolls. They gave a new spin on fashion dolls; instead of traditional cloth clothing, Polly Pockets used unique "Polly Stretch" garments, created by Genie Toys, rubbery plastic clothes that could be put on the dolls and removed. There are also some boy dolls (Rick, Steven, etc.). Like the Barbie and Bratz brands, Polly Pocket has also expanded into a media franchise, consisting of DVD-exclusive animated films, books and a website, with the latter currently a section of/under the larger Mattel website.

In 2002, Mattel stopped producing the smaller Polly Pocket playset range but continued to produce the larger fashion doll.

In 2004, Mattel introduced the Polly Pocket "Quik Clik" line. Instead of having rubbery clothes, the dolls had plastic clothes that would click together by magnets. On November 22, 2006, 4.4 million Polly Pocket playsets were recalled by Mattel after children in the United States swallowed loose magnetic parts. Affected toys had been sold around the world for three years prior. As defined by the U.S. Consumer Product Safety Commission (CPSC), the use of magnets in children's toys — and particularly the inclusion of two or more magnetic parts in such toys — has resulted in many significant injuries in children, and has been repeatedly flagged as hazardous by the commission, who have sued many companies over such toys and announced many recalls.

Mattel relaunched Polly Pocket in 2010 by making further changes to the dolls, including increasing feet size, head size, and leg size, although the height remains approximately the same. However, fan reactions were mixed. It also introduced the Cutants, which are inanimate–animal hybrids.

In 2012, Polly Pocket toys were discontinued in the U.S. but remained available in Europe and South America. The brand dwindled, eventually only being sold in Brazil. The dolls would continue to be sold exclusively in Brazil until the brand's 2018 reboot.

On February 12, 2018, Garrett Sander announced on his Instagram page that Polly Pocket would be making a comeback. The new toys are miniature dolls in playsets, like the original 1990s Polly Pocket, rather than the larger Fashion Polly. However, they are slightly larger than the original 1990s version. Rather than slotting into holes in the case, the new Polly is made of a flexible plastic that sticks to certain surfaces, but also bends so she can sit in a chair.

In addition to the reboot in 2018, Hot Topic  and Unique Vintage clothing brands have created merchandise inspired by the vintage Polly Pocket brand including handbags, makeup and clothing items for adults.

Characters
Below is the list of characters who appeared in the Polly Pocket media franchise:

Current
Polly Pocket: the title character with light-toned skin, blonde hair, and light blue eyes. She is described as being very confident, cool, friendly, optimistic, adventurous, resourceful, and loyal. She loves having fun, adventures, and, importantly, friends. She has many hobbies, such as skateboarding, water-skiing, snowboarding, shopping, playing music, and singing. Polly has a fun and cool fashion style.
 Voiced by Tegan Moss (2004–06), Sue Thorpe (2011–15), and Emily Tennant (2018–present)
Shani Smith: dark-toned skin, dark brown hair, and brown eyes. She is described as being intelligent and creative. Shani is a technical genius who loves taking things apart to see how they work, as well as a proficient inventor. She loves gadgets, such as MP3 players and headphones. Shani has an urban fashion style. 
 Voiced by Chiara Zanni (2004–06), Erin Fitzgerald (2011–15), and Kazumi Evans and Cherlandra Estrada (2018–present)
Lila Draper: pale-toned skin, brown hair, and light purple eyes, and later strawberry blonde hair and blue eyes, then a redhead and green eyes. She is described as being sweet and fashionable. Lila is a fashionista who loves to go shopping for the latest styles, trends, and accessories. She is also best friends with Crissy, as well as a talented dancer. Lila's fashion style is glam. She is of Scottish ancestry.
 Voiced by Brittney Wilson (2004–06), Kate Higgins (2011–15), and Shannon Chan-Kent (2018–present)

Former
Lea: tan-toned skin with freckles, orange hair, and light green eyes, and later red hair and blue eyes. She is described as being athletic and giggly. Lea is an athlete who enjoys many sports, like skiing and soccer. She is also an animal lover. Lea's fashion style is girly. She is of Irish ancestry.
 Voiced by Natalie Walters (2004–06) and Erin Fitzgerald (2011–15)
Crissy (originally called Ana): pale-toned skin, black hair, and blue eyes, and later olive-toned skin, black hair with a magenta streak, and brown eyes. She is described as being stylish and outspoken and hates it when her looks are messed up. Crissy is an aspiring fashion designer who is always full of many artistic, fashionable ideas and she'd love to be a rock star. She has many hobbies, such as roller-skating, snowboarding, practicing sports, shopping, singing, and playing music. Crissy has a fun and cool artsy fashion style. She was white, then Latina, then Asian.
 Voiced by Nicole Bouma (2004–06) and Wendee Lee (2011–15)
Rick: light-toned skin, blonde hair, and light blue eyes, like Polly, and has a crush on her. He enjoys playing pranks, skateboarding, and likes being his own rock star. Like Crissy, Polly, and Shani, he has his own fashion style.
 Voiced by Andrew Francis (2004–06) and Cindy Robinson (2011–15)
Todd (originally called Steven): light-toned skin, dark brown hair, and dark brown eyes. He is Rick’s best friend and follower.
 Voiced by Matt Hill
Kerstie: light-toned skin, dark brown hair, and blue eyes. She is described as being humorous and enthusiastic. Kerstie is a talented cook who is proficient and somewhat familiar with old and new recipes. She also likes telling her friends about her adventures.
 Voiced by Debi Derryberry.

Expansion to Media Franchising

Films
 Polly Pocket: Lunar Eclipse (2004)
 Polly Pocket 2: Cool at the Pocket Plaza (2005)
 PollyWorld (2006)
 Untitled Polly Pocket film (TBA)

Web series
Mattel rebooted Polly Pocket in 2010 with two-season web serial programming, which is currently only available on YouTube. The first season of the first web series was made using flash animation technology with the second using CGI. The CGI technology would be revisited in the second web series 2013 with the same voice cast as the first.

TV Series

Mattel relaunched the brand for a second time in 2018 by collaborating with DHX Media (now WildBrain) on a new animated TV series which initially aired on Canadian television on Family Channel on July 8, 2018. The series featured a young girl named Polly who has a magical locket that allows her and her friends to shrink down to a tiny size. The series is currently available for streaming on YouTube, Netflix, Hulu and Disney+.

Play set Characters 
Below is the list of recurring characters who appeared multiple early Polly Pocket play sets This list does not include characters who only appear in one or two playsets.
Polly Pocket: Originally with blond curly blonde/yellow hair and a hairband in various colors that usually matched her outfit, Polly Pocket was the mayor of Pollyville.  Later her design changed to feature a ponytail instead of the curly hair.
 Tiny Tina: a doll with blonde pigtails
Wee Willie: a boy doll with a blonde bowl cut
Midge: A strawberry blonde doll with a "Dutch boy" straight hair with bangs usually wearing overalls
Little Lulu: Straight brown hair parted in the middle, usually wearing a playsuit or swimsuit
Pixie:  brown hair parted in the middle in flip style, usually wearing a long sleeve top with a scoop neckline in various colors
Titch: A boy doll with brown hair bowl cut, sometimes wears a hat

Other Toylines
Some similar toylines to Pollypocket include Might Max by BlueBird as linked below.  But a few other small scale sets that came out around the time of the original BlueBird compact Polly Pocket sets include Starcastle Kingdom by Treadmasters in 1995  and Fairy Winkles were produced by Kenner in 1993-95.  Small compact toys featuring Pokémon characters were created by Tomy Nitendo in 1997 called Pokémon mate which were a similar scale and style to the Polly Pocket toys.  and lastly Bluebird Toys produced miniature Disney sets from 1997 to 1999.

See also
 Mighty Max

References

External links
  (under Mattel Play)

Doll brands
Transforming toys
1990s toys
Mattel franchises
Fashion dolls
American animated web series
Products introduced in 1989